Albert R. Thayer  (19 October 1878 - October 1965) was an American painter and etcher. Born in Concord, Massachusetts, he studied at the Boston Museum School and at the Art Students League in New York City. His teachers include Edmund Tarbell, Eric Page and Aldro Hibbard. He was a gifted teacher  as well as oil painter and was a long-standing member of the Rockport Art Association, which he served as Treasurer.
    
His work is included in the Museum Collection of the Rockport Art Association and was featured in a traveling exhibition titled 'Images of a New England Seacoast' 1900–1950. He provided the illustration for the American edition of a popular Christmas book, The Man at the Gate of the World. He also provided the illustrations for the book, The Mystery of Molly Mott.  He is best known for marshy landscapes and harbour scenes, but he painted on occasion a Boston house that caught his fancy.  His oil paintings seldom appear in art auctions with only a couple of sales in the past twelve years.

He painted a portrait of Rose Fitzgerald Kennedy.

References

External links 
AskART.com. The Artists Bluebook: Albert R. Thayer

Works by Albert Rufus Thayer 
 Street Scene, France
 Putting up the Sails
 Old Ice House

19th-century American painters
American male painters
20th-century American painters
Art Students League of New York alumni
People from Concord, Massachusetts
1878 births
1965 deaths
Painters from Massachusetts
American landscape painters
19th-century American male artists
20th-century American male artists